The 1900–01 Scottish Division Two was won by St Bernard's with Motherwell finishing bottom.

Table

References

Scottish Football Archive

Scottish Division Two seasons
2